LOLF may refer to:
 , a French law
 Loss of load frequency, a reliability index.